Persatuan Sepakbola Indonesia Djember (simply known as Persid or Persid Jember) is an Indonesian football club based in Jember, East Java. They currently compete in the Liga 3.

The stadium that Persid plays in is called Notohadinegoro Stadium and is located in downtown Jember.

History 
These teams in 2007 playing in First Division after the 2002/2003 season on the Second Division Competition PSSI.

These teams also have produced several players who take part in football Indonesia, such as Hendro Kartiko, Anton Wahyudi, etc.

Perseid prepared in PSSI First Division competition in 2008 with former players handled by Persebaya, Santoso Pribadi. Previous Perseid had several times failed to qualify for the Premier Division although they often placed in the top standings in the group. With most of the original players including national goalkeeper Hendro Kartiko, and having gained the experience of doing business in Jember and playing in the national football, Perseid expected to qualify for the 2021 Liga 3 with a contracted coach Riono Asnan.

Players

Current squad

Honours
Liga Indonesia Second Division
Winners (1): 2002-03

References

External links
Persid Jember at Liga-Indonesia.co.id
 

 
Football clubs in Indonesia
Football clubs in East Java
Association football clubs established in 1952
1952 establishments in Indonesia